Balázs Tóth (born 6 January 1967) is a Hungarian gymnast. He competed in eight events at the 1988 Summer Olympics.

References

1967 births
Living people
Hungarian male artistic gymnasts
Olympic gymnasts of Hungary
Gymnasts at the 1988 Summer Olympics
Gymnasts from Budapest